Leonard James Barry (27 October 1901 – 17 April 1970) was an English footballer who played at both professional and international levels as an outside left.

Career
Barry was born in Sneinton, Nottingham. He played professional club football for Notts County, Leicester City and Nottingham Forest. At Nottingham Forest, Barry scored one goal in 17 games in the Football League.

He also earned five caps for the English national side between 1928 and 1929.

References

1901 births
1970 deaths
Footballers from Nottingham
English footballers
England international footballers
Association football outside forwards
Notts County F.C. players
Leicester City F.C. players
Nottingham Forest F.C. players
English Football League players